"The Boys of Summer" is a song by Eagles vocalist and drummer Don Henley, with lyrics written by Henley and music composed by Mike Campbell of Tom Petty and the Heartbreakers.

The lead single from Henley's album Building the Perfect Beast, "The Boys of Summer" was released on October 26, 1984. It reached number five on the Billboard Hot 100 chart in the US, number one on the Billboard Top Rock Tracks chart, and number 12 in the UK Singles Chart.

The music video won several awards. "The Boys of Summer" was also performed live by Henley with the reunited Eagles; a version is included on the group's 2005 DVD Farewell 1 Tour: Live from Melbourne.

Writing
Tom Petty and the Heartbreakers guitarist Mike Campbell wrote a demo for "The Boys of Summer" while experimenting with a LinnDrum drum machine. He showed it to Tom Petty, but they felt it did not fit with the record they were working on, Southern Accents. At the suggestion of producer Jimmy Iovine, Campbell played it for Don Henley, who wrote the lyrics and recorded the vocal. They rerecorded the song after Henley decided to change the key.

Composition 
The song is cemented by a repetitive guitar riff. The song was recorded in the key of F major with a tempo of 88 beats per minute.  Henley's vocals span F3 to A4.

The lyrics appear to be about the passing of youth and entering middle age, with the nostalgic theme of "summer love" and reminiscence of a past relationship. In a 1987 interview with Rolling Stone, Henley explained that the song is about aging and questioning the past—a recurring theme in Henley's lyrics (cf. "The End of the Innocence", and "Taking You Home".) In an interview with NME in 1985, Henley explained the '"Deadhead sticker on a Cadillac" lyric as an example of his generation selling out.

The song's title is borrowed from Roger Kahn's 1972 acclaimed book about the Brooklyn Dodgers, which in turn borrowed it from a famous Dylan Thomas poem.

Accolades 
"The Boys of Summer" reached No.  5 on the Billboard Hot 100 and topped the Billboard Top Rock Tracks chart for five weeks.  It was his most successful hit in the United Kingdom, reaching No. 12 on the UK Singles Chart. A re-release of the single in 1998 also reached No. 12.

Billboard called it "dance oriented pop swimming in synths and reverberating guitar."

In 1986, Henley won the Grammy Award for Best Male Rock Vocal Performance for the song. "The Boys of Summer" was ranked No. 416 on Rolling Stone magazine's list of The 500 Greatest Songs of All Time. "The Boys of Summer" is included in The Pitchfork 500, Pitchfork Media's "Guide to the Greatest Songs from Punk to Present."

Tom Petty was astounded by the track's success. One day, he and Campbell were out on a car drive to listen to a mix of their song "Don't Come Around Here No More", but turned on the ignition and heard "The Boys of Summer". Campbell changed the station in case the song would upset Petty, but another station was also playing the song. Petty enjoyed listening to it and regretted initially turning it down.

Music video 
The music video to "The Boys of Summer" is a French New Wave-influenced piece directed by Jean-Baptiste Mondino.  Shot in black-and-white, it shows the main character of the song at three different stages of life (as a young boy, a young adult and middle-aged), in each case reminiscing about a past relationship. Interspersed with these scenes are segments of Henley singing the words of the song while riding in a pickup truck. The boy is dressed in a style typical of the 1950s, the teenage lovers are dressed in a style characteristic of the early 1960s while the middle-aged man is dressed in the style of the 1980s. As a boy in the 1950s, the protagonist practices playing the drums, suggesting musical aspirations; as a teenager in the 1960s, he walks down a beach with his girlfriend whom he kisses passionately; and as a middle-aged man in the 1980s, he appears to be an executive of some sort who is comfortable, but unhappy in life as he sits at his desk remembering his youth. The young boy in the video is played by a seven-year-old Josh Paul, while the girl is played by Audie England. Interspersed with these scenes are segments of Henley articulating the words of the song while driving in a convertible. At its conclusion, the video uses the post-modern concept of exposing its own workings, as with a wry expression Henley drives the car away from a rear projection screen.

The video won the Video of the Year at the 1985 MTV Video Music Awards (leading Henley to comment at the Awards the following year that he had won for "riding around in the back of a pickup"). It also won that year's awards for Best Direction, Best Art Direction, and Best Cinematography. The Best Direction award was presented to Mondino by Henley's then-former Eagles bandmate Glenn Frey.

Personnel 
 Don Henley – vocals
 Mike Campbell – synthesizers, guitars, LinnDrum programming, percussion 
 Danny Kortchmar – synthesizers, guitars
 Steve Porcaro – synthesizers 
 Larry Klein – bass

Charts

Weekly charts

Year-end charts

Certifications

DJ Sammy version

In 2002, Spanish trance artist DJ Sammy (with vocals performed by Dutch singer Loona) covered the song. It was released in 2002 as the third and final single from second studio album, Heaven (2002). This cover peaked at number two in the United Kingdom and was one of New Zealand's most successful hits of in 2002, reaching number three and earning a gold certification from Recorded Music NZ (RMNZ). The cover also reached number nine in Australia and the top 20 in Flanders, Ireland, and the Netherlands.

Music video
The music video was filmed in València, Spain, and was released in November 2002.

Track listing
 "The Boys of Summer" (original radio edit) – 3:58	
 "The Boys of Summer" (original extended) – 6:33	
 "The Boys of Summer" (Green Court remix) – 8:08	
 "Appalachian Fall" – 4:54

Charts

Weekly charts

Year-end charts

Certifications

Release history

The Ataris version

In 2003, the rock band The Ataris covered "The Boys of Summer" for their album So Long, Astoria. The song became their second single when a radio station began to play it. The single peaked at No. 2 on the Billboard Modern Rock Chart (held off the No. 1 top spot by Linkin Park's "Faint") and No. 20 on the Billboard Hot 100. It remains their most successful single.

The Ataris' version of the song replaced the "Deadhead sticker" reference with one that the band felt was more appropriate to the age group of their fans, namely a "Black Flag sticker", in honor of the punk rock band from the 1980s. In a 2016 interview, Henley was asked if he was okay with the lyric change and responded critically, "No, not really... And if you noticed, we haven’t heard much from the Ataris since then."  On the contrary, Mike Campbell claimed that he enjoyed the Ataris cover, stating that "it's not a song you expect a young band like that to do, but I kind of like their version of it."

Music video
The music video was directed by Steven Murashige and was released in July 2003.

Chart performance

Certifications

References

External links
Video on VH1 Classic

Songs about old age
1984 songs
1984 singles
2002 singles
2003 singles
Black-and-white music videos
Columbia Records singles
Data Records singles
Don Henley songs
DJ Sammy songs
Geffen Records singles
Ministry of Sound singles
The Ataris songs
MTV Video of the Year Award
Number-one singles in Scotland
Songs written by Don Henley
Songs written by Mike Campbell (musician)
Grammy Award for Best Male Rock Vocal Performance
MTV Video Music Award for Best Direction
Music videos directed by Jean-Baptiste Mondino
Rock ballads
1980s ballads
American synth-pop songs
Songs about nostalgia